Uruguay competed at the 2019 Parapan American Games held from August 23 to September 1, 2019 in Lima, Peru. In total athletes representing Uruguay won one gold medal and one bronze medal. The country finished in 14th place in the medal table.

Medalists

Athletics 

Uruguay competed in athletics.

Judo 

Henry Borges won the gold medal in the men's 60 kg event.

Shooting 

Uruguay competed in shooting.

Swimming 

Gonzalo G. Dutra Irinitz won the bronze medal in the men's 100m breaststroke SB9 event.

Table tennis 

Uruguay competed in table tennis.

References 

2019 in Uruguayan sport
Uruguay at the Pan American Games
Nations at the 2019 Parapan American Games